The List of United Kingdom Speedway Fours Champions is the list of teams and riders who have won the United Kingdom's Fours Championship that corresponded to the relevant league at the time. The list is split into three divisions, the top tier, the second tier and third tier, all three divisions have been known in various guises such as National League and Premier League, etc. This list gives a complete listing of the winners for each season.

During some years there was only one or two divisions, particularly tur of 1995 and 1996 when the top two tiers of speedway merged.

Fours Champions (chronological order)

Tier One
Premier League Four-Team Championship 1995–1996

Tier Two
National League Four-Team Championship 1976-1994
Premier League Four-Team Championship 1997–2016
SGB Championship Fours 2017–present

Tier Three
Conference League Four-Team Championship 2003–2008
National League Fours 2011–present

List of Winners

References

Lists of motorsport champions
Speedway in the United Kingdom